Sebastian Brendel (born 12 March 1988) is a German sprint canoeist who has competed since 2007. Brendel is the 2016 Olympic champion in the C-1 1000 metres and C-2 1000 metres events.

Career
He has won three medals at the ICF Canoe Sprint World Championships with a silver (C-4 500 m: 2007) and two bronzes (C-1 1000 m: 2009, 2010). He is the current world record holder in the C-1 1000m as of the 2014 ICF World Championships in Moscow, Russia.

Brendel won a gold medal at the 2012 London Olympics in canoeing's C-1 1,000 metres event for his country. At the 2016 Rio de Janeiro Olympics, he defended this title successfully  and added another one, at the C-2 1000 metres, together with Jan Vandrey. Germany won the gold medal in this category also in London, but with Peter Kretschmer and Kurt Kuschela.

He also competed in the Tokyo 2020 Olympic Games and won Bronze in the Men's C-2 1000 metres event.

References

External links

  
 
 
 
 
 

1988 births
Living people
Sportspeople from Schwedt
People from Bezirk Frankfurt
German male canoeists
Olympic canoeists of Germany
Olympic gold medalists for Germany
Olympic bronze medalists for Germany
Olympic medalists in canoeing
Canoeists at the 2012 Summer Olympics
Canoeists at the 2016 Summer Olympics
Canoeists at the 2020 Summer Olympics
Medalists at the 2012 Summer Olympics
Medalists at the 2016 Summer Olympics
Medalists at the 2020 Summer Olympics
ICF Canoe Sprint World Championships medalists in Canadian
European Games medalists in canoeing
European Games gold medalists for Germany
Canoeists at the 2015 European Games
Canoeists at the 2019 European Games
European Games bronze medalists for Germany